Turnera subulata is a species of flowering plant in the passionflower family known by the common names white buttercup, sulphur alder, politician's flower, dark-eyed turnera, and white alder. Despite its names, it is not related to the buttercups or the alders. It is native to Central and South America, from Panama south to Brazil. It is well known in many other places as an introduced species, such as Malaysia, Indonesia, several other Pacific Islands, the Caribbean, and Florida in the United States. It is commonly cultivated as a garden flower.

Growth
This plant is a perennial herb growing from a thick taproot and woody stem base. The leaves are roughly oval in shape with toothed edges. The undersides are glandular and coated in white hairs. The upper surfaces may be somewhat hairy, as well. Flowers occur in the leaf axils, borne in calyces of hairy, glandular sepals. The petals are rounded to oval, the longest exceeding . They are white or yellowish with darker bases. The dark patches at the bases are nectar guides. The center of the flower is rough, feeling like a cat's tongue. The fruit is a hairy capsule containing seeds with white arils. The seeds are dispersed by ants, who are likely attracted to their high lipid content. The plant is pollinated by a variety of insects, including the bee Protomeliturga turnerae, which is oligolectic, specializing on this plant species and depending completely on it for reproduction. The male bee builds his territory around the plant, for example. Thus, this particular bee is a common pollinator of the flowers. Other insects observed at the plant include many other bee species, such as Trigona spinipes, Frieseomelitta doederleinii, and Plebeia flavocinta, butterflies such as Nisoniades macarius and Urbanus dorantes, and the beetle Pristimerus calcaratus.

Appearance
Like most other Turnera, this species is heterostylous, with two morphs. The "pin" morph has long styles in its flowers, while the "thrum" morph has short styles. Both morphs produce the same amount of pollen. One study reported that during pollination, pin flowers receive more pollen from thrum flowers than from other pin flowers. The genes that cause this dimorphism in style size are the subject of current research. So far, it has been established that short styles contain proteins, polygalacturonases, that are absent in long styles.

Traditional medicine

This plant has uses in traditional medicine.

References

External links
 

subulata
Medicinal plants